The 1913 Vanderbilt Commodores football team represented Vanderbilt University in the 1913 Southern Intercollegiate Athletic Association football season. The 1913 season was Dan McGugin's 10th year as head coach. Members of the Southern Intercollegiate Athletic Association, the Commodores played six home games in Nashville, Tennessee and finished the season with a record of 5–3 overall and 2–1 in conference play.

Schedule

Season summary

Michigan
On October 25, 1913, Michigan played Vanderbilt in Nashville, Tennessee.   The game matched Michigan head coach Fielding H. Yost against his former player and brother-in-law, Dan McGugin.  Owing to the relationship between Yost and McGugin, the two teams played nine times between 1905 and 1923, with Michigan winning eight times.  Michigan won the 1913 game, 33–2, in the worst defeat for Vanderbilt since McGugin became the head coach.  The game was marked by the Wolverines' most extensive use of the forward pass during the 1913 season.  Michigan's air attack was described as showing "dazzling proficiency", as the forward passes were responsible for four of Michigan's five touchdowns.  In the Detroit Free Press, E. A. Batchelor wrote: "Vanderbilt fairly gasped in amazement as the Wolverines shot the ball from one to another with the precision of baseball players."

Virginia
Virginia blanked the Commodores, 34–0.

Tennessee
Red Rainey scored Tennessee's touchdown. Goat Carroll missed the kick.  Tennessee's right guard S. D. Bayer drew a 33-yard, half the distance to the goal penalty for slugging, and was ejected by umpire Bradley Walker. The first down after, Hord Boensch threw a touchdown pass to Enoch Brown. Brown ran the last ten yards shaking off several defenders. Boensch kicked goal and won the game for Vanderbilt. One account reads "'Red' Rainey shone for Tennessee, though he was later relegated to the side lines after a collision with one A. Sikes, Esq., otherwise known as the "Roaring Representative from Williamson."

Auburn
The Commodores lost to the SIAA champion Auburn Tigers 14–6.

References

Vanderbilt
Vanderbilt Commodores football seasons
Vanderbilt Commodores football